Pliny Fisk III (born May 30, 1944 in New York) is a co-founder and co-director of the "Center for Maximum Potential Building Systems" (CMPBS), a sustainable design and planning 501c3 non-profit established in 1975. Fisk also serves as Fellow in Sustainable Urbanism and Fellow in Health Systems Design at Texas A & M University, where he holds a joint position as signature faculty in Architecture, Landscape Architecture and Planning. Fisk has previously held positions at: Ball State University, The University of Texas (at Austin), Mississippi State University and the University of Oklahoma.

Education and personal life
Fisk received B.Arch., M.Arch., and M.L.Arch. degrees from the University of Pennsylvania. His graduate studies focused on ecological land planning under the guidance of Ian McHarg. His work has also been influenced substantially by Russell Ackoff in various disciplines associated with the systems sciences.

He has four children and is married to Gail Vittori.

Work
Fisk's special contributions in the research field have been principally in materials and methods; from low-cost building systems development (referred to as „open building“) to wide-ranging material development (that includes: low carbon and carbon balanced cements, and many other low impact materials). He was instrumental in developing the first input/output life-cycle assessment model for material flow in the U.S. and connecting this to a Geographic Information System, so that human activities can be placed into the context of natural systems on a national scale. The model for preserving abundant, naturally renewable resources is entirely removed from the questions of social equity, quality of environment and human welfare. The model represents greenhouse gases, criteria air pollutants and toxic releases of over 12,500,000 businesses. He has also developed an alternative land planning and design methodology (referred to as „Eco- Balance Design and Planning“).

Early work
After completing his education at University of Pennsylvania, – Fisk worked for Ian McHarg (in Philadelphia); and (in 1969) he assisted McHarg – as the coordinator of engineering and ecology for New Orleans East: a new town of 100,000 (on the Mississippi Delta). He – served as an assistant professor at Ball State University: for one year (1969–1970), – before accepting a teaching position at The University of Texas at Austin.

Center for Maximum Potential Building Systems
In 1975 (with a seed grant from the Menil Foundation), – Fisk (and his then wife: Daria Bolton) founded the Center for Maximum Potential Building Systems (CMPBS) in Austin, Texas.  CMPBS – is a nonprofit 501(c)3 education, research, and demonstration organization.

The CMPBS site – features numerous demonstration projects: including the „Advanced Green Builder Demonstration Home“ (AGBDH) – a 170 square meter structure, featuring numerous sustainable building techniques, including: a 50,000 liter rainwater harvesting system and two methods of straw-bale construction. The AGBDH – is the first modern building in the U.S. to use 100% Portland Cement-free concrete. The concrete used in the building – is a fly-ash, Caliche mix (developed by CMPBS). The AGBDH – was also designed for easy disassembly; pays particular attention – to the lifecycles of water, energy and materials; and incorporates local and recycled materials. The AGBDH – currently serves as the main offices for CMPBS.

Other examples of Fisk's work on the CMPBS site – include the 2002 University of Texas at Austin entry for the Department of Energy Solar Decathlon competition, the Greenforms erector-set prototype and a foam and MgO Cement modular building system.

Pliny Fisk – currently co-directs CMPBS with his wife (Gail Vittori).

Crystal City, Nicaragua and the Laredo Demonstration Farm

When the „Lo Vaca Gathering Co“ shut off the natural gas supply to the small town of Crystal City (Texas) in the fall of 1977, – Fisk developed the idea of using Army surplus wood stoves and abundant mesquite for heating. By January 1978, Crystal City residents – had installed nearly 1,000 wood stoves. In subsequent years – Fisk led an effort to manufacture and install inexpensive solar hot water heaters using salvaged materials. The production of the solar collectors – also helped bolster the job market of Crystal City.

In 1983, Fisk was sponsored by the „Center for Investigation and Documentation of the Atlantic Coast“ (CIDCA) – to set into motion a large scale indigenous housing program for the Miskito Indians of Nicaragua's Atlantic Coast. Fisk's goal in the project – was to draw upon the available natural and human resources of the region to address an extreme housing shortage. 

In 1991: the Texas Department of Agriculture (and – Laredo Junior College) – hired Fisk (and CMPBS): to design and build a demonstration farm (outside the arid South Texas city, of Laredo). The  farm.

City of Austin: Green Building Program
In 1991, Fisk and Vittori – developed "A Conceptual and Contextual Framework (for the City of Austin)"; that – served as the basis – for the formation of the world's first municipal green building program (now – operating as „Austin Energy Green Building“). The cooperative effort – earned the United Nations Earth Summit Award: for Exemplary Public Environmental Initiative, in 1992 (the only United States organization – to receive recognition at the Earth Summit).

Awards
In 1992 – Fisk received the United Nations Earth Summit Award: for Exemplary Public Environmental Initiative, for the City of Austin's Green Building Program – conceived and developed by The Center for Maximum Potential Building Systems.

In 2002 – Fisk was awarded the U.S. Green Building Council’s first Sacred Tree Award: in the public sector category. He – is also a recipient of the Passive Solar Pioneer Award (from the American Solar Energy Society)  and the National Center for Appropriate Technology’s 15th Year Distinguished Appropriate Technology Award, – recognizing significant work in the field of environmental protection.

Fisk – led two award-winning student teams for Department of Energy Solar Decathlon:
 in the 2002 (with the University of Texas at Austin);
 in the 2007 (with Texas A&M University).

The US Green Building Council – honored Pliny Fisk with the USGBC Leadership Award – for Organizational Excellence, in 2008: for his role – as a founding member of the American Institute of Architects Committee on the Environment.

Publications
 Center for Maximum Potential Building Systems: «35 Years – of Serious Commotion»;
 «Pliny Fisk III: Creating a Maximum Potential Future» – by Sam Martin.

See also
Gail Vittori
Center for Maximum Potential Building Systems

References

External links
 www.cmpbs.org

1944 births
Living people
20th-century American architects
Sustainable building
21st-century American architects
Architects from New York (state)
University of Pennsylvania School of Design alumni
Texas A&M University faculty
Ball State University faculty
University of Texas at Austin faculty
Mississippi State University faculty
University of Oklahoma faculty